The International Softball Federation (ISF) is the international governing body for the sport of softball with its world headquarters and training centre at Plant City, Florida. The ISF is a non-profit corporation recognized by the International Olympic Committee (IOC) and SportAccord (formerly the General Association of International Sports Federations).

In 2013 a merger between the International Baseball Federation (IBAF) and International Softball Federation (ISF), the world governing bodies for baseball and softball, created the World Baseball Softball Confederation (WBSC) which now serves as the overarching world governing body for the sports of baseball, softball, and Baseball5. The ISF represents the softball division.

The ISF organizes and conducts world championship competition in women's & men's fast pitch, junior women's & junior men's fast pitch (19-and-under), women's, men's & coed slow pitch, and women's & men's modified pitch.  The ISF sanctions regional championships and provides technical support to Regional (Multi-Sport) Games.  Additionally the ISF qualifies teams for Olympic softball competition in coordination with the IOC.  The ISF provides the official playing rules for international competition including: Olympic Games, world championships, regional championships, regional games and other sanctioned competitions.

As part of a campaign to return softball to the Olympic Games in time for 2020, in April 2013, the ISF began a process of merging with the International Baseball Federation to form a new combined federation for both sports, the World Baseball Softball Confederation (WBSC).

Hall of Fame 

For a list of inductees and their biographical sketches, see footnote
The ISF Hall of Fame has inducted members every other year since 1981. Inductees include players, coaches, umpires, and administrators (plus individuals in the Meritorious Service category). Individuals are nominated by the national governing body for softball in their country. Nominees are considered by the ISF Hall of Fame Commission. Voting is conducted at the biennial ISF congress. The ISF is planning to build an ISF Hall of Fame & Museum at its world headquarters in Plant City, Florida, USA.

Medal of Honor
For a list of recipients, see footnote
The ISF Medal of Honor was first awarded in 1990.

List of members 
The ISF considers some dependent territories, such as the British Virgin Islands, to be "countries" for the purposes of international competition. Those dependent territories compete separately from their "parent" country. There are members from every continent in the world, except Antarctica.

The national governing body for softball in each of the countries listed below is considered to be a member of the ISF.

Africa 
There are 18 member countries.

Americas 
There are 33 countries and dependent territories.

Asia 
There are 22 member countries and dependent territories.

Europe 
There are 39 countries and dependent territories.

Oceania 
There are 12 member countries and dependent territories.

See also 
World Baseball Softball Confederation

References

External links 
 
Ecuador Official Softball Website
Irish Softball Association
Amateur Softball Association of the Philippines
Danish Softball Federation
Hellenic Amateur Softball Federation

Softball
Organizations based in Florida
Softball in the United States
Softball organizations
Sports in Hillsborough County, Florida
Sports organizations established in 1952